Ernst Ariël (Ernst) Cramer (born 26 June 1960 in Amersfoort) is a former Dutch politician. He is a member of the ChristianUnion (ChristenUnie) and a former member of the House of Representatives of the Netherlands.

Cramer was a member of the city council as well as an alderman of Zeewolde for the Reformed Political League (Gereformeerd Politiek Verbond) and later its successor the ChristianUnion. From 2006 until 2010 he was an MP.

Ernst Cramer is a member of the Reformed Churches in the Netherlands (Liberated) and lives in Woerden.

References 
  Parlement.com biography

1960 births
Living people
Aldermen in Flevoland
People from Zeewolde
Christian Union (Netherlands) politicians
Municipal councillors in Flevoland
Members of the House of Representatives (Netherlands)
People from Amersfoort
Reformed Churches (Liberated) Christians from the Netherlands
Reformed Political League politicians
21st-century Dutch politicians